The 1913 Lancashire Cup was the ninth year of this regional rugby league competition. The cup was won by Oldham who beat the holders Wigan in the final at Wheater's Field, Broughton, Salford, by a score of 5-0. The attendance at the final was 18,000 and receipts £610.

Background 
Warwickside team, Coventry, did not enter this year so the number of teams entering this year’s competition was reduced to 12, there were four byes in the first round.

Competition and results

Round 1  
Involved  4 matches (with four byes) and 12 clubs

Round 2 – quarterfinals

Round 3 – semifinals

Final

Teams and scorers  

Scoring - Try = three (3) points - Goal = two (2) points - Drop goal = two (2) points

The road to success

See also 
1913–14 Northern Rugby Football Union season

Notes 
 1 Wheater's Field was the home ground of Broughton Rangers.

References

RFL Lancashire Cup
Lancashire Cup